Antoine de Caunes (born 1 December 1953) is a French television presenter, actor, writer and film director. He is the son of two prominent French personalities, television journalist-reporter Georges de Caunes and television announcer Jacqueline Joubert. He is the father of the actress Emma de Caunes.

Career
He began his career writing theme songs for cartoons for Antenne 2 under the pseudonym of Paul Persavon, including Cobra and Space Sheriff Gavan (known in France as X-Or).

His early TV appearances included Chorus (1975), the series Les Enfants du rock, again for A2, and then his breakthrough with Nulle part ailleurs for Canal+.

In 1988, De Caunes started making an English-language version of his French music programme Rapido, for Janet Street-Porter's youth and entertainment programming strand DEF II, with new episodes of Rapido usually being broadcast as part of DEF II's Wednesday night schedule on BBC2. He then went on to create the long-running magazine programme Eurotrash for Channel 4, with this humorous post-pub entertainment show co-presented by Jean-Paul Gaultier for the few few series and featuring regular spots for European stars like Lolo Ferrari. He also presented a short-lived chat show on Channel 4 called Le Show. In addition, he appeared in an advertising campaign for Rowntree's Fruit Pastilles ice lollies.

From 2013 until 2015, he hosted the daily evening show Le Grand Journal on Canal+.

He provided voices in the Aardman Animation TV show Rex the Runt.

He is a long-time AIDS awareness campaigner, fronting the organisation  (AIDS Solidarity).

Filmography

Film acting 
 1989: Pentimento – Charles
 1996:  – Jérôme
 1997:  – Antoine
 1997:  – Alex
 1998: L'homme est une femme comme les autres – Simon Eskenazy
 1999: Au cœur du mensonge – Germain-Roland Desmot
 1999:  – Claude
 2000:  – Pierre Nivel
 2001: Le Vélo de Ghislain Lambert – The narrator
 2002:  – The captain of the KKK
 2002: Les Clefs de bagnole – an actor refusing to play in a Baffie film 
 2006:  – Julien Rossi
 2007: Mr. Bean's Holiday – Television presenter
 2008:  – Julien
 2008: 48 heures par jour – Bruno
 2009:  – Simon Eskenazy
 2010: Mumu – The Colonel
2021: Kaamelott: The First Chapter – Dagonet

Television acting
 1987: Objectif: Nul – Igor and Grichka Bogdanoff
 1988-1992: Rapido - series presenter
 1993–2007: Eurotrash – series presenter
 1998: Bob le magnifique (made-for-television movie) by Marc Angelo - François Morin / Bob Saint Clar
 2002: Les Amants du bagne (made-for-television movie) by Thierry Binisti - Albert Londres
 2006-2008: Kaamelott (television series) – Dagonet
 2007: Off Prime (television series, season 1, episode 2) – as himself
 2010: Du hard ou du cochon! (television series, episode 3) – Fluck
 2012: Bref (television series, episode 53) by Kyan Khojandi et Bruno Muschio – as himself
 2013: L'homme à la tête de kraft (short film) by Thierry Dupety and Sandra Joubeaud
 2013: Dangereuses retrouvailles (made-for-television movie) by Jérôme Debusschère - Paul Aubras
 2013: Hitchcock by Mocky, episode: "Le don d'Iris"

Directing
 1997: T'en as ?
 2001: 
 2002: Monsieur N.
 2006: Désaccord parfait
 2008: Coluche, l'histoire d'un mec
 2011: Yann Piat, chronique d'un assassinat (made-for-television movie)

Voice work 
 1999: Stuart Little  by Rob Minkoff - Stuart Little
 2001: La Route d'Eldorado by Don Paul and Eric Bergeron - Miguel
 2001: Le Vélo De Ghislain Lambert by Philippe Harel – The Narrator
 2001-2002: The New Adventures of Lucky Luke (series) - Lucky Luke
 2002: Stuart Little 2 by  Rob Minkoff - Stuart Little
 2004: Voyage autour du soleil (made-for-television movie), docu-fiction on the space conquest
 2007: La France made in USA (made-for-television movie) – The Narrator
 2011: Illegal Love by Julie Gali, documentaire - Mark Leno
 2012: Cendrillon au Far West by Pascal Hérold – The Prince

Discography 
Two CD titles, Il a pas peur de personne, Film Music by BO from the animated show Lucky Luke televised on France 3 and sold in 2001 by Sony Music.

Songwriter
 1983: Tchaou et Grodo
 1984: Au pays des quat'z'amis
 1984: Y'en a qui (Marie Dauphin)
 1984: X-Or
 1985: Clémentine
 1985: Cobra
 1985: L'Empire des Cinq
 1986: Lady Oscar
 1986:

Participation
 2009 - On n'est pas là pour se faire engueuler !, album in homage to Boris Vian. Cantate des boîtes

Bibliography 
Antoine de Caunes wrote his first book published with Éditions Albin Michel in the collection Rock & Folk in the Magma groupe:
 Magma, 187p., 1978. 
He wrote two novels about the conquests of the New York private detective, Sam Murchinson:
 C'est bon, mais c'est chaud (1990)
 C'est beau mais c'est triste (1998)
Several collections of his speeches Nulle part ailleurs were published; texts written with Albert Algoud:
 Vous permettez que je vous appelle Raymond ?, 1990.
 Pas mal pour un lundi, 1990.
 J'aime beaucoup ce que vous faites, 1991
 Une ambulance peut en cacher une autre, 1992.
 Bien entendu, je plaisante, 1993. 
 Le Petit Gildas illustré, 1993. 
He also wrote a dictionary: 
 Dictionnaire Amoureux du Rock, Plon, 2010

Radio shows 
 Popopop, since August 2017, every weekday at 3pm UK time, on France Inter, National French radio station.

References

External links
 
 Eurotrash at Channel 4 - Adult content

1953 births
Living people
Male actors from Paris
French television presenters
French male film actors
French male television actors
French radio presenters